"New Old Trucks" is a song recorded by Canadian country group James Barker Band and American country singer Dierks Bentley. The song was co-written by the band's lead singer and guitarist James Barker along with Casey Brown, Jordan Minton, and Hunter Phelps.

Background
The song's writers, James Barker, Casey Brown, Jordan Minton, and Hunter Phelps joined together for a writing session at Brown's house in Nashville, Tennessee. Both Minton and Phelps had the song title "New Old Trucks" in their notes, with Barker saying "It instantly clicked when we heard that phrase". Barker said the goal when writing the song was "making listeners think of their own first truck, or the one they still drive". A representative of the band sent a demo of the song to Bentley, who immediately wanted to join the song, telling Barker the song reminded him of his Chevrolet truck that he inherited from his father. Barker stated that every lyric in the song was something one of the writers had actually experienced, and the first line was about his first truck.

Critical reception
Logan Miller of Front Porch Music called "New Old Trucks" a "legendary collaboration", and adding that it "fits so well on the radio" and was "sure to see some great airplay on both sides of the border". The Country Note referred to the track as an "anthem for truck enthusiasts". The Reviews Are In described the song as "an ode to old trucks that keep on rolling when everything else changes or breaks or moves on," also calling it "romantic and nostalgic".

Commercial performance
"New Old Trucks" reached a peak of number one on Billboard Canada Country chart for the week of March 5, 2022, becoming the band's fourth number one hit, and second consecutive number one after "Over All Over Again", while also becoming Bentley's ninth chart topper in Canada. It also peaked at number 63 on the Canadian Hot 100 for the same week, marking a new career high peak charting entry there for the band.

Credits and personnel
Credits adapted from AllMusic.

 Taylor Abram – backing vocals
 James Barker – vocals, songwriting
 Dierks Bentley – vocals
 Casey Brown – songwriting
 Todd Clark – production, programming, recording, backing vocals
 Dave Cohen – piano
 Josh Ditty – recording
 Jay Dufour – mixing
 Jordan Minton – songwriting
 Hunter Phelps – songwriting
 Lex Price – bass guitar
 Jerry Roe – drums
 Derek Wells – guitar
 Charlie Worsham – banjo, mandolin

Charts

References

2021 songs
2021 singles
James Barker Band songs
Dierks Bentley songs
Songs written by James Barker (singer)
Song recordings produced by Todd Clark
Vocal collaborations